Biscuitville Fresh Southern is a family-owned regional fast-food restaurant chain consisting of 65+ locations in the U.S. states of North Carolina and Virginia. The restaurant specializes in the traditional southern breakfast made from scratch and with local ingredients. All biscuits served at Biscuitville restaurants are made from scratch every 15 minutes.

History 
The company, originally named Mountainbrook Fresh Bread & Milk (eventually known as Pizzaville), started as two bread stores in Burlington, North Carolina The founder, Maurice Jennings, began making pizzas, but soon wanted a way to put the business to work in the morning. The biscuit recipe was developed by the Jennings family. The company began making biscuits, and the company eventually sold more biscuits than pizzas. The company opened its first biscuit-only operation named "Biscuitville", located in Danville, Virginia. 

In 2007, the corporate headquarters was moved to Greensboro, North Carolina.

As of July 2021, Biscuitville has 65+ locations.

References

External links

 Biscuitville official website

Companies based in Greensboro, North Carolina
Restaurants in North Carolina
Economy of the Southeastern United States
Regional restaurant chains in the United States
Fast-food chains of the United States
Restaurants established in 1975
American companies established in 1975
1975 establishments in Virginia